Rajib Lochan Saren is an Indian politician and member of All India Trinamool Congress. He is an MLA, elected from the Bandwan constituency in the 2016 West Bengal state assembly election. In 2021 assembly election, he was re-elected from the same constituency.

References 

Trinamool Congress politicians from West Bengal
Living people
People from Purulia district
West Bengal MLAs 2021–2026
Year of birth missing (living people)